Wisnu Yuli Prasetyo (born 11 July 1994) is an Indonesian badminton player. He joined the PB Djarum in 2015, and previously played for the Surya Baja Surabaya in East Java. He won his first senior international title at the 2012 Malaysia International tournament, and in 2013, he won the men's singles bronze at the Southeast Asian Games. In 2017, he emerged as the men's singles champion at the National Championships in Pangkal Pinang.

Achievements

Southeast Asian Games

BWF International Challenge/Series 

 BWF International Challenge tournament
 BWF International Series tournament

Performance timeline

National team 
 Junior level

Individual competitions 
 Junior level

 Senior level

Record against selected opponents 
Record against year-end Finals finalists, World Championships semi finalists, and Olympic quarter finalists..

References 

1994 births
Living people
People from Tulungagung Regency
Sportspeople from East Java
Indonesian male badminton players
Competitors at the 2013 Southeast Asian Games
Southeast Asian Games bronze medalists for Indonesia
Southeast Asian Games medalists in badminton
21st-century Indonesian people